Bold Park Reservoir (also known as Mount Kenneth Reservoir) is a roofed reservoir in Bold Park in the suburb of City Beach, in Perth, Western Australia. It is sited on the western edge of Bold Park, off Kalinda Drive.

Water from either the groundwater schemes of Gwelup and Mirrabooka is fed to the reservoir, along with water from the hills dams. The reservoir is also topped up with water from a local artesian bore.

In 2005 the reservoir had half of its roof torn off in a violent storm.

External links

Reservoirs in Western Australia
Town of Cambridge